= Alice Holford (bailiff) =

Bailiff of London Bridge (died 1455)

- Died: 1455
- Occupation: Bailiff of London Bridge
- Spouse: Nicholas Holford

Alice Holford (died 1455) was an English bailiff of London Bridge for 20 years. She was a rare example of a woman in authority in the fifteenth century.

== Life ==
Holford was married to Nicholas Holford, who was the bailiff (toll-keeper) of London Bridge. When he died in 1433 she took over the job. She had the task of gathering the toll from boats that sailed under the bridge and from the wagons that passed over it into London. The task was complicated because the fee depended on what was being carried. A woman having a position of authority and responsibility in the fifteenth century was unusual. This came about because she inherited her husband's business, however she evidently proved herself to be highly capable. She died in office in 1455, twenty-two years later.
